The Miss Nebraska Teen USA competition is the pageant that selects the representative for the state of Nebraska in the Miss Teen USA pageant. The pageant is directed by Vanbros & Associates, headquartered in Lenexa, Kansas. In 2002, Nebraska joined the Vanbros group of state pageants for the Miss USA and Teen USA system. In 2022, Nebraska became the 28th state that won the Miss Teen USA title for the first time.

Nebraska has had only six placements at Miss Teen USA. The state was the second-to-last to make its first placement, which came in 2004, when Meagan Winings advanced to the semi-finals. 

Five Nebraska teens have crossed over to win the Miss Nebraska USA title and compete at Miss USA, with Sarah Summers being the most successful, winning the title of Miss USA 2018. One other Nebraskan previously competed in the Miss America's Outstanding Teen.

Faron Medhi of Omaha was crowned Miss Nebraska Teen USA 2022 on March 6, 2022 at Rose Blumkin Performing Arts Center in Omaha. She went on to win Miss Teen USA 2022 on October 1st, 2022, becoming the very first delegate from Nebraska to win the title.

Results summary

Placements
Miss Teen USA: Faron Medhi (2022)
3rd runner-up: Audrey Eckert (2020)
Top 10: Meagan Winings (2004)
Top 15/16: Danielle Zuroski (2006), Erin Swanson (2019), Daisy Sudderth (2021)
Nebraska holds a record of 6 placements at Miss Teen USA.

Awards
Miss Congeniality: Jasmine Fuelberth (2013), Daisy Sudderth (2021)

Winners 

1 Age at the time of the Miss Teen USA pageant

References

External links
Official website

Nebraska
Women in Nebraska